Desh is an esteemed Bengali language literary magazine published by the ABP Group from India on the 2nd and the 17th of every month. This magazine, which is in publication since 1933, has been edited by editors like Sagarmoy Ghosh in the past. The present editor is Suman Sengupta. After the death of Sagarmoy Ghosh, Desh started publishing non-fiction articles and essays on topics of current, historical and cultural interest. Started as a weekly, it evolved into a fortnightly in more recent years. It has also drifted from being a pure literary magazine to more current affairs-oriented format. Journalist and Ramon Magsaysay award winner Amitabha Chowdhury edited the magazine for quite some time after Sagarmoy Ghosh. Desh is published from 6 Prafulla Sarkar Street, Kolkata 700 001.

Desh is still considered to be the best literary magazine of the Bengali-speaking intelligentsia. It is often referred to as the "New Yorker of Bengal" . Almost all of the eminent authors and stalwarts of Bengali language and literature have sometimes or the other, written in Desh, from Rabindranath Tagore to Satyajit Ray, Mahasweta Devi, Sunil Gangopadhyay. The puja issue of Desh remains a major literary attraction in Bengali literature. The magazine, currently running in its eightieth year, is one of the oldest and heritable magazines in India.

Desh also has a sub-publication named Boier Desh (since 2003) where latest books in Bengali and English language are reviewed by well-known authors and critics. Boier Desh also carries with its every issue an interview of famous Bengali and International Literary personalities. Boier Desh is a quarterly magazine.

See more

References

External links
 Official website

Magazines established in 1933
Literary magazines published in India
Mass media in Kolkata
ABP Group
Bengali-language magazines
1933 establishments in India